Rüdiger Fahlenbrach (born 1974 in Essen, Germany) is a German economist specialised in finance. He is a professor of finance at EPFL (École Polytechnique Fédérale de Lausanne) and holds the Swiss Finance Institute Senior Research Chair.

Career 
From 1995 to 1999, Fahlenbrach studied business administration at the University of Mannheim in Germany and at the ESSEC Business School in France. He then pursued a PhD in finance with Andrew Metrick at the Wharton School of the University of Pennsylvania. In 2004, he graduated with a PhD thesis  "Essays in Corporate Governance". Afterwards he joined the Fisher College of Business at the Ohio State University as an assistant professor of finance to work on ownership structures of large public corporations for corporate policies and performance. In 2009 he moved to the Swiss Finance Institute at EPFL where he currently is full professor and holds a Swiss Finance Institute Senior Research Chair.

He has held visiting professorships,   at Vienna University of Economics and Business, European School of Management and Technology (ESMT) in Berlin, University of New South Wales, Paris Dauphine University, and Halle Institute for Economic Research.

Research 
Fahlenbrach's research interests are on empirical corporate finance and banking. He has investigated corporate governance issues that arise from the separation of ownership and control in the modern public corporation,  and examined the causes and effects of the financial crisis of 2007 and 2008, including the role of bank governance and regulatiuon for the crisis. He has published in the Journal of Finance, the Journal of Financial Economics, the Review of Financial Studies, the Review of Finance, and the Journal of Financial and Quantitative Analysis.

His research has been covered in  The New York Times, The Wall Street Journal, The Economist, Le Temps, NZZ, Handelsblatt, Forbes Magazine, USA Today, and Financial Times.

Distinctions 
Fahlenbrach served as director of the European Finance Association (2018-2020), and in 2020, he was appointed Chair of the Scientific Council and member of the Scientific Advisory Board of the Halle Institute for Economic Research. He is a research member of the European Corporate Governance Institute. He has been  associate editor of the Review of Financial Studies (2013-2016) and Financial Management (2012-2016).  Since 2014, he has been associate editor of the Review of Finance.

Selected works

References

External links 
 
 Website of the Swiss Finance Institute Senior Research Chair
Website of the Swiss Finance Institute at EPFL

1974 births
Living people
University of Mannheim alumni
ESSEC Business School alumni
University of Pennsylvania alumni
Academic staff of the École Polytechnique Fédérale de Lausanne
German economists